Carlton Overton Tremper (March 22, 1906 – January 9, 1996), was a former professional baseball player who played outfield for the Brooklyn Robins in the 1927 & 1928 seasons. He attended college at the University of Pennsylvania.

External links

1906 births
1996 deaths
Major League Baseball outfielders
Brooklyn Robins players
Baseball players from New York (state)
Macon Peaches players